There are at least 174 members of the pea family, Fabaceae, found in Montana. Some of these species are exotics (not native to Montana) and some species have been designated as Species of Concern.

Amorpha canescens, lead plant
Astragalus adsurgens, rattle milkvetch
Astragalus agrestis, meadow milkvetch
Astragalus alpinus, alpine milkvetch
Astragalus americanus, American milkvetch
Astragalus aretioides, sweetwater milkvetch
Astragalus argophyllus, silver-leaved milkvetch
Astragalus atropubescens, Kelsey's milkvetch
Astragalus australis, Indian milkvetch
Astragalus barrii, Barr's milkvetch
Astragalus bisulcatus, two-grooved milkvetch
Astragalus bourgovii, Bourgeau's milkvetch
Astragalus canadensis, Canadian milkvetch
Astragalus canadensis, Morton's Canadian milkvetch
Astragalus canadensis, shorttooth Canadian milkvetch
Astragalus ceramicus, painted milkvetch
Astragalus ceramicus, pottery milkvetch
Astragalus chamaeleuce, ground milkvetch
Astragalus cibarius, browse milkvetch
Astragalus cicer, chickpea milkvetch
Astragalus convallarius, lesser rushy milkvetch
Astragalus crassicarpus, groundplum milkvetch
Astragalus drummondii, Drummond's milkvetch
Astragalus eucosmus, pretty milkvetch
Astragalus falcatus, Russian milkvetch
Astragalus flexuosus, flexible milkvetch
Astragalus geyeri, Geyer's milkvetch
Astragalus gilviflorus, threeleaf milkvetch
Astragalus gracilis, slender milkvetch
Astragalus grayi, Gray's milkvetch
Astragalus hyalinus, summer milkvetch
Astragalus inflexus, bent milkvetch
Astragalus kentrophyta, mat milkvetch
Astragalus kentrophyta, spiny milkvetch
Astragalus kentrophyta, spiny milkvetch
Astragalus lackschewitzii, Lackschewitz' milkvetch
Astragalus lentiginosus, freckled milkvetch
Astragalus lentiginosus, sodaville milkvetch
Astragalus leptaleus, park milkvetch
Astragalus lotiflorus, low milkvetch
Astragalus microcystis, least bladdery milkvetch
Astragalus miser, Yellowstone milkvetch
Astragalus miser, prostrate milkvetch
Astragalus miser, timber milkvetch
Astragalus miser, woody milkvetch
Astragalus missouriensis, Missouri milkvetch
Astragalus oreganus, wind river milkvetch
Astragalus pectinatus, narrowleaf milkvetch
Astragalus plattensis, Platte River milkvetch
Astragalus platytropis, broad-keeled milkvetch
Astragalus purshii, Pursh's milkvetch
Astragalus purshii, woollypod milkvetch
Astragalus racemosus, raceme milkvetch
Astragalus robbinsii, Robbins' milkvetch
Astragalus scaphoides, bitterroot milkvetch
Astragalus shortianus, Short's milkvetch
Astragalus spatulatus, tufted milkvetch
Astragalus tenellus, loose-flower milkvetch
Astragalus terminalis, railhead milkvetch
Astragalus vexilliflexus, bent-flowered milkvetch
Caragana arborescens, siberian peashrub
Coronilla varia, common crown-vetch
Cytisus scoparius, Scotch broom
Dalea candida, white prairie clover
Dalea enneandra, nine-anther prairie clover
Dalea purpurea, purple prairie clover
Dalea villosa, silky prairie clover
Glycyrrhiza lepidota, wild licorice
Hedysarum alpinum, apline sweet-vetch
Hedysarum boreale, boreal sweet-vetch
Hedysarum occidentale, western sweet-vetch
Hedysarum sulphurescens, yellow sweet-vetch
Lathyrus bijugatus, latah tule pea
Lathyrus latifolius, broad-leaf peavine
Lathyrus ochroleucus, pale vetchling peavine
Lathyrus sylvestris, flat pea
Lathyrus tuberosus, earth-nut peavine
Lotus corniculatus, garden bird's-foot-trefoil
Lotus tenuis, slender trefoil
Lotus unifoliolatus, American bird's-foot trefoil
Lupinus arbustus, long-spur lupine
Lupinus argenteus, depressed lupine
Lupinus argenteus, lodgepole lupine
Lupinus argenteus, silvery lupine
Lupinus caespitosus, stemless-dwarf lupine
Lupinus caudatus, Kellogg's spurred lupine
Lupinus leucophyllus, woolly-leaf lupine
Lupinus polyphyllus, Burke's lupine
Lupinus polyphyllus, Wyeth's lupine
Lupinus polyphyllus, bigleaf lupine
Lupinus pusillus, small lupine
Lupinus sericeus, Pursh's silky lupine
Medicago falcata, yellow alfalfa
Medicago lupulina, black medic
Medicago polymorpha, toothed medic
Medicago sativa, alfalfa
Melilotus albus, white sweetclover
Melilotus officinalis, yellow sweetclover
Onobrychis viciifolia, common sainfoin
Oxytropis besseyi, Bessey's locoweed
Oxytropis besseyi, Montana locoweed
Oxytropis borealis, boreal locoweed
Oxytropis campestris, Columbia locoweed
Oxytropis campestris, Cusick's locoweed
Oxytropis campestris, field locoweed
Oxytropis campestris, yellow-flower locoweed
Oxytropis deflexa, blue nodding locoweed
Oxytropis deflexa, nodding locoweed
Oxytropis lagopus, hare's-foot locoweed
Oxytropis lambertii, purple locoweed
Oxytropis parryi, Parry's locoweed
Oxytropis podocarpa, stalked-pod locoweed
Oxytropis riparia, Ruby Valley locoweed
Oxytropis sericea, white locoweed
Oxytropis splendens, showy locoweed
Pediomelum argophyllum, silvery scurfpea
Pediomelum cuspidatum, large-bracted scurf-pea
Pediomelum esculentum, pomme-de-prairie
Pediomelum hypogaeum, little Indian breadroot
Psoralidium lanceolatum, lance-leaf scurfpea
Psoralidium tenuiflorum, few-flowered scurfpea
Robinia pseudoacacia, black locust
Sphaerophysa salsula, bladder-vetch
Thermopsis montana, mountain goldenbanner
Thermopsis montana, slender goldenbanner
Thermopsis rhombifolia, roundleaf thermopsis
Trifolium arvense, rabbit-foot clover
Trifolium aureum, yellow clover
Trifolium beckwithii, Beckwith's clover
Trifolium campestre, low hop clover
Trifolium cyathiferum, cup clover
Trifolium dasyphyllum, whip-root clover
Trifolium dubium, suckling clover
Trifolium eriocephalum, woolly-head clover
Trifolium fragiferum, strawberry-head clover
Trifolium gymnocarpon, hollyleaf clover
Trifolium haydenii, Hayden clover
Trifolium hybridum, alsike clover
Trifolium latifolium, twin clover
Trifolium longipes, long-stalk clover
Trifolium microcephalum, woolly clover
Trifolium nanum, dwarf clover
Trifolium parryi, Parry's clover
Trifolium pratense, red clover
Trifolium repens, white clover
Trifolium variegatum, white-tip clover
Trifolium wormskioldii, Wormskjold's clover
Vicia americana, American purple vetch
Vicia americana, American vetch
Vicia americana, mat vetch
Vicia cracca, tufted vetch
Vicia sativa, spring vetch
Vicia tetrasperma, lentil vetch
Vicia villosa, winter vetch

Further reading

See also
 List of dicotyledons of Montana

Notes

Montana
Montana